Gichi / Ayatsuri ningyou / Karakuri no soko (ギチ・あやつり人形・カラクリの底) is a compilation EP by Japanese band The Mad Capsule Markets. This album collects all the songs from the P.O.P era (including a few B-sides), which were re-done for the Gichi Video. The song "Ayatsuri Ningyo" (Marionette) has appeared on four different albums, with different interpretations of the song.

Track listing

The Mad Capsule Markets albums
1994 EPs